

438001–438100 

|-bgcolor=#f2f2f2
| colspan=4 align=center | 
|}

438101–438200 

|-bgcolor=#f2f2f2
| colspan=4 align=center | 
|}

438201–438300 

|-bgcolor=#f2f2f2
| colspan=4 align=center | 
|}

438301–438400 

|-bgcolor=#f2f2f2
| colspan=4 align=center | 
|}

438401–438500 

|-bgcolor=#f2f2f2
| colspan=4 align=center | 
|}

438501–438600 

|-id=523
| 438523 Figalli ||  || Alessio Figalli (born 1984), an Italian mathematician who is an expert on partial differential equations. In 2018, he received the Fields medal "for contributions to the theory of optimal transport and its applications in partial differential equations, metric geometry and probability." || 
|}

438601–438700 

|-bgcolor=#f2f2f2
| colspan=4 align=center | 
|}

438701–438800 

|-bgcolor=#f2f2f2
| colspan=4 align=center | 
|}

438801–438900 

|-id=829
| 438829 Visena ||  || Vicente Serrano Navarro (1956–2008) was a Spanish lawyer who worked and lived in many Latin American countries. He was the brother-in-law of the discoverer, Antonio Garrigós-Sánchez. || 
|}

438901–439000 

|-id=973
| 438973 Masci ||  || Frank Masci (born 1972), responsible for instrumental calibration, characterization and software development for image processing and source detection for the Spitzer and WISE telescopes and NEOWISE mission, as well as at the Palomar Transient Factory || 
|}

References 

438001-439000